Launch Complex 16 (LC-16) at Cape Canaveral Space Force Station, Florida is a launch complex built for use by LGM-25 Titan missiles, and later used for NASA operations before being transferred back to the US military and used for tests of MGM-31 Pershing missiles. Six Titan I missiles were launched from the complex between December 1959 and May 1960. These were followed by seven Titan II missiles, starting with the type's maiden flight on March 16, 1962. The last Titan II launch from LC-16 was conducted on May 29, 1963.

Following the end of its involvement with the Titan missile, LC-16 was transferred to NASA, which used it for Gemini crew processing, and static firing tests of the Apollo Service Module's propulsion engine. Following its return to the US Air Force in 1972, it was converted for use by the Pershing missile, which made its first flight from the complex on May 7, 1974. Seventy-nine Pershing 1a and 49 Pershing II missiles were launched from LC-16. The last Pershing launch from the facility was conducted on March 21, 1988. It was deactivated the next day and subsequently decommissioned under the Intermediate-Range Nuclear Forces Treaty.

It was announced on January 17, 2019, that Relativity Space had entered a 5-year agreement to use LC-16 for its Terran 1 orbital launch vehicle and eventually its Terran R.

See also
 Pershing missile launches

References

 

Cape Canaveral Space Force Station